A flood risk assessment (FRA) is an assessment of the risk of flooding from all flooding mechanisms, the identification of flood mitigation measures and should provide advice on actions to be taken before and during a flood.

The sources of water which produce floods include:
 Groundwater (saturated groundwater)
 Vadose (water flowing the ground in an unsaturated state)
 Surface water
 Artificial water (burst water mains, canals or reservoirs)
 Rivers, streams or watercourses
 Sewers and drains
Flooding of low-lying coastal regions due to sea level rise

For each of the sources of water, different hydraulic intensities occur. Floods can occur because of a combination of sources of flooding, such as high groundwater and an inadequate surface water drainage system. The topography, hydrogeology and physical attributes of the existing or proposed development need to be considered. A flood risk assessment should be an evaluation of the flood risk and the consequences and impact and vulnerability.

Non-professional flood risk assessments can be produced by members of the public, Architects, environment assessors, or others who are not specifically professionally qualified in this field. However, it is a complex evaluation and such assessments they can be rejected by Authorities as inadequate, or could be considered as negligent in the event of a flooding event, damage and a claim to insurers being made.

In the UK, the writing of professional flood risk assessments is undertaken by Civil Engineering Consultants. They will have membership of the Institution of Civil Engineers and are bound by their rules of professional conduct. A key requirement is to ensure such professional flood risk assessments are independent to all parties by carrying out their professional duties with complete objectivity and impartiality. Their professional advice should be supported by professional indemnity insurance for such specific professional advice ultimately held with a Lloyd's of London underwriter.

Professional flood risk assessments can cover single buildings, or whole regions. They can part of a due-diligence process for existing householders or businesses, or can be required in England and Wales to provide independent evidence to a planning application on the flood risk.

England and Wales
In England and Wales, the Environment Agency requires a professional Flood Risk Assessment (FRA) to be submitted alongside planning applications in areas that are known to be at risk of flooding (within flood zones 2 or 3) and/ or are greater than 1ha in area, planning permission is not usually granted until the FRA has been accepted by the Environment Agency.

PPS 25 – England only
Flood Risk Assessments are required to be completed according to the National Planning Policy Framework, which replaces Planning Policy Statement PPS 25: Development and Flood Risk. The initial legislation (PPG25) was introduced in 2001 and subsequently revised.

PPS 25 was designed to "strengthen and clarify the key role of the planning system in managing flood risk and contributing to adapting to the impacts of climate change." and sets out policies for local authorities to ensure flood risk is taken into account during the planning process to prevent inappropriate development in high risk areas and to direct development away from areas at highest risk.

In its introduction, PPS25 states "flooding threatens life and causes substantial damage to property [and that] although [it] cannot be wholly prevented, its impacts can be avoided and reduced through good planning and management".

Composition of an FRA
For a flood risk assessment to be written, information is needed concerning the existing and proposed developments, the Environment Agency modeled flood levels and topographic levels on site. At its most simple (and cheapest) level an FRA can provide an indication of whether a development will be allowed to take place at a site.

An initial idea of the risk of fluvial flooding to a local area can be found on the Environment Agency flood map website.

FRAs consist of a detailed analysis of available data to inform the Environment Agency of flood risk at an individual site and also recommend to the developer any mitigation measures. More costly analysis of flood risk can be achieved through detailed flood modelling to challenge the agency's modelled levels and corresponding flood zones.

The FRA takes into account the risk and impact of flooding on the site, and takes into consideration how the development may affect flooding in the local area. It also includes provides recommendations as to how the risk of flooding to the development can be mitigated.

FRAs should also consider flooding from all sources including fluvial, groundwater, surface water runoff and sewer flooding.

Northern Ireland
In 2006, the Planning Service, part of The Department of the Environment, published Planning Policy Statement 15 (PPS15): Planning and flood risk.  The guidelines are precautionary and advise against development in flood plains and areas subject to historical flooding. In exceptional cases a FRA can be completed to justify development in flood risk areas. Advice on flood risk assessment is provided to the Planning Service by the Rivers Agency, which is the statutory drainage and flood defence authority for Northern Ireland.

Republic of Ireland
In 2009, the Department of the Environment, Heritage and Local Government and Office of Public Works published planning guidelines requiring local authorities to apply a sequential approach to flood risk management.  The guidelines require that proposed development in flood risk areas must undergo a justification test, consisting of a flood risk assessment.

See also
Flood warning
 Floods directive
 Flood Modeller (software used to undertake flood risk assessments)

References

Flood control
Environmental policy in the United Kingdom
Extreme value data